Dominique Provoyeur (born 3 March 1977) is a South African sailor. She competed in the Yngling event at the 2008 Summer Olympics.

Personal life
Dominique Provoyeur is the daughter of round-the-world yachtsman and boatbuilder, Jean-Jacques Provoyeur.

References

External links
 

1977 births
Living people
South African female sailors (sport)
Olympic sailors of South Africa
Sailors at the 2008 Summer Olympics – Yngling
Sportspeople from Cape Town